Sultan Hassanal Bolkiah Highway (Jawi: ليبوهراي سلطان حسنال بولكيه) is a major highway in Bandar Seri Begawan, Brunei. It is named after the current Sultan of Brunei, Sultan Hassanal Bolkiah.

Route background
Kilometre 0 of the highway starts at Jalan Raja Isteri Pengiran Anak Saleha, two kilometres away from the capital centre, Bandar Seri Begawan, next to the commercial area of Batu Satu. The highway starts from the junction southeast, then makes a sharp bend to continue northwest. The highway passes by the Raja Isteri Pengiran Anak Saleha Hospital, Kiulap and Kiarong. At the Kiarong Roundabout, the highway goes through the roundabout via an underpass and makes a turn north. The highway flies over Jalan Gadong and passes by the commercial area of Gadong. Further along is where Tungku Highway begins its route, starting westwards. The highway makes a smooth curve northeast, then it passes by the Brunei International Airport. Then, it flies over Jalan Utama Berakas and passes by settlements of Lambak and Madang. The highway makes a sharp turn southeast and ends at the Sungai Tilong-Sungai Akar-Manggis-Serusop Roundabout at Sungai Akar. The road then continues as Jalan Sungai Akar towards Land Transport Department Headquarters.

Speed Limit
The speed limit for this highway is 80 kilometres per hour (km/h) for normal road conditions. During wet road conditions, the speed limit is 65 km/h. Exceptions to this rule are:
 50 km/h on all ramps along the highway.
 65 km/h on kilometre 0 to kilometer 0.5 due to a sharp bend.

Junction list

Intersection names are conjectural and unofficial.

 I/C - interchange, I/S - intersection

Roads and Highways in Brunei